Naminohana Kazutaka  (born 19 March 1969 as Kazuhiro Kudo) is a former sumo wrestler from Namioka, Aomori, Japan. He was active from 1984 until 1997 and his highest rank was komusubi. He fought for Futagoyama stable and won one special prize for Fighting Spirit. After retiring at age 28 because of injury he went into the restaurant business.

Career
He was born in Namioka, Aomori, the third son of a farmer. He won a sumo competition at Namioka Tachi Nozawa Elementary School and fought for the fourth grade sumo club even when still in the third grade. At junior high he moved away from sumo and was thinking of becoming a physical education teacher. However he was recruited by the former yokozuna Wakanohana Kanji I and joined his Futagoyama stable upon graduation from junior high school. Initially fighting under his own surname of Kudo, he made his professional debut in May 1984. Weighing less than  early in his career he rose rather slowly up the ranks, but he compensated for his lack of physique by hard training. He was promoted to the second highest juryo division in November 1990 and reached the top makuuchi division for the first time in September 1992. After falling back to juryo in 1994 he won two yusho or tournament championships in that division. Upon his return to makuuchi in November 1994 he scored 10–5 and won his first and only sansho, for Fighting Spirit. He was nominated for the prize on the condition that he win on the final day, and had he failed to do so, there would have been no sansho at all awarded in a tournament for the first time since they were introduced in 1947. His highest rank was komusubi, which he held for one tournament in March 1995 after a 9–6 record at maegashira 7 in the previous tournament saw him somewhat fortuitously promoted to the sanyaku ranks. He scored only 6–9 and never made komusubi again. He injured his elbow in a match with Kaio in March 1996, which restricted his performances and led to six consecutive losing records and demotion to the makushita division.

He is the only wrestler in modern sumo to reach a sanyaku rank but never defeat any yokozuna or ozeki in his career. He was only eligible to face Akebono and Musashimaru during his 18 tournament stay in the top division as the other yokozuna and ozeki were all fellow members of Futagoyama stable, and sumo rules prevent wrestlers from the same stable meeting in competition.

Retirement from sumo
He retired in March 1997 at the age of 28. He had no elder stock in the Japan Sumo Association and so was unable to stay in sumo. He ran a restaurant in Nishi-Azabu, Tokyo and has appeared on J Sports ESPN's  sumo program.

Fighting style
Naminohana was an oshi-sumo specialist who preferred to push and thrust rather than go for a grip on the mawashi or belt. His  most common winning kimarite or techniques were oshi-dashi (push out), yori-kiri (force out), hataki-komi (slap down) and tsuki-otoshi (thrust over).

He was known for trying to tempt his opponent to begin the bout early, a practice known as jikanmae.

Career record

See also
List of sumo tournament second division champions
Glossary of sumo terms
List of past sumo wrestlers
List of komusubi

References

External links

1969 births
Living people
Japanese sumo wrestlers
Sumo people from Aomori Prefecture